Giovanni Bellati (1750 – early 1800s) was an Italian painter active in the Neoclassic period. He was born in Valsassina. He studied in Milan at the Brera Academy, but then traveled to Rome.

References

1750 births
18th-century Italian painters
Italian male painters
19th-century Italian painters
Painters from Milan
Year of death missing
Brera Academy alumni
19th-century Italian male artists
18th-century Italian male artists